Ian Venables (born 1955) is a British composer of art songs and chamber music.

Biography
Ian Venables was born in Liverpool in 1955 and was educated at Liverpool Collegiate Grammar School. He studied music with Richard Arnell at the Trinity College of Music, and later with Andrew Downes, John Mayer, and John Joubert at the Royal Birmingham Conservatoire.

His compositions encompass many genres, and, in particular, he has added significantly to the canon of English art song. Described as "one of the finest song composers of his generation," he has written over eighty works in this genre, which include eight song-cycles: Venetian Songs – Love’s Voice, Op.22 (1995) and Invite to Eternity for tenor and string quartet, Op.31 (1997), both recorded; Songs of Eternity and Sorrow for tenor, string quartet, and piano, Op.36 (2004); On the Wings of Love for tenor, clarinet, and piano, Op.38 (2006); The Pine Boughs Past Music for baritone and piano, Op.39 (2010); Remember This, Op.40, (2011); The Song of the Severn for baritone, string quartet, and piano, Op.43 (2013)and Through These Pale Cold Days, Op.46 (2016). Other songs for solo voice and piano include Two Songs, Op.28 (1997) and Six Songs, Op.33 (1999–2003), A Dramatic Scena – At the Court of the Poisoned Rose for counter-tenor and piano, Op. 20 (1994). His songs have been performed by national and internationally acclaimed artists that include: Roderick Williams, James Gilchrist, Patricia Rozario, Andrew Kennedy, Ian Partridge, Allan Clayton, Caroline MacPhie, Mary Bevan, Brian Thorsett, Susan Bickley, Benjamin Hulett, Sally Porter Munro, Benjamin Appl, Geraldine McGreevy, Alessandro Fisher, Nicky Spence, Daniel Norman, Howard Wong, Nathan Vale, Michael Lampard, Peter Savidge, Kevin McLean-Mair, Mary Plazas, Peter Wilman, Nicholas Mulroy, Nick Pritchard, Elizabeth Atherton, Kristian Sorensen and Ciara Hendrick.

His many chamber works include the Piano Quintet, Op.27 (1995), described by Roderic Dunnett in The Independent as "lending a new late 20th Century dimension to the English pastoral," and the String Quartet, Op.32 (1998), as well as smaller pieces for solo instruments and piano. He has also written works for choir including the Requiem, Op.48, the anthem O God Be Merciful Op.51,  Awake, Awake, the World is Young, Op.34, and the Rhapsody for organ, Op.25 (1996). There are two recordings of the Requiem

He is an acknowledged expert on the 19th century poet and literary critic John Addington Symonds, and apart from having set five of his poems for voice and piano, he has contributed a significant essay to the book John Addington Symonds: Culture and the Demon Desire (Macmillan Press Ltd, 2000).

He is President of the Arthur Bliss Society, a Vice-president of the Gloucester Music Society, and Chairman of the Ivor Gurney Society. His continuing work on the music of Gurney has led to 2003 orchestrations of two of his songs, counterparts to two that by Herbert Howells, and newly edited versions of Gurney's War Elegy (1919) and A Gloucestershire Rhapsody (1921), with Philip Lancaster. His works have been recorded on the Signum, Somm, Regent and Naxos, and Delphian CD labels.

His music is published by Novello & Co (Music Music).

Works list
Chamber music
 Elegy for cello and piano, Op. 2 (1981)
 Elegy (arr. for viola and piano), Op. 2a (1987)
 Three Pieces for violin and piano, Op. 11 (1986)
 Diversions for brass quintet, (jazz ensemble) Op. 13 (1992)
 Sonatina for oboe and piano, Op. 14 (1995)
 Three Bridges Suite for brass decet (jazz ensemble), Op. 18 (1994)
 Triptych for sixteen brass and two percussion, Op. 21 (1993)
 Sonata for flute (or violin) and piano, Op. 23 (1989)
 Soliloquy for viola and piano, Op. 26 (1994)
 Piano Quintet Op. 27 (1989–1996)
 Poem for cello and piano, Op. 29 (1997)
 String Quartet Op. 32 (1997–1998)
 The Moon Sails Out for cello and piano, Op. 42 (2010)
 It Rains (arr for cello and piano), Op. 33a (2016)
 At Malvern (arr for cello and piano), Op. 24a (2016)
 In Memoriam I.B.G (arr for cello and piano), Op. 39, No 4a (2016)
  Canzonetta for Clarinet and String Quartet Op. 44 (2013)

Organ
 Rhapsody for organ, Op. 25 (1996)

Piano
 Sonata (1975) In Memoriam D.S.C.H Op. 1 (revised 1984)
 The Stourhead Follies Four Romantic Impressions Op. 4 (1985)
 Three Short Pieces Op. 5 (1986)
 Impromptu The Nightingale and the Rose Op. 8 (1996)
 Portrait of Janis Op. 9 (2000)
 Caprice Op. 35 (2001)

Choral
 O Sing Aloud to God, Anthem for S.A.T.B and organ, Op. 19 (1993)
 Awake! awake, the world is young, Anthem for chorus, mezzo-soprano, brass, percussion and organ, (with optional strings) Op.34 (1999)
 While shepherds watched their flocks by night, Carol for S.A.T.B and organ, (2001)
 Requiem  Op. 48 for S.A.T.B and organ, (2020)
 Requiem  Op. 48a for S.A.T.B and Orchestra (2021)
 God Be Merciful  Op.51 for S.A.T.B and organ, (2021)
 Versicles and Responses  for S.A.T.B and organ, (2022)

Vocal
 Midnight Lamentation for voice and piano, Op. 6 (1974); words by Harold Monro
 Pain for voice and piano, Op. 10 (1991); words by Ivor Gurney
 A Kiss for voice and piano or string quartet, Op. 15 (1992); words by Thomas Hardy
 Easter Song for voice and piano, Op. 16 (1992); words by Edgar Billingham
 At the Court of the Poisoned Rose for voice and piano, Op. 20 (1994); words by Marion Angus
 Love's Voice – Four Venetian Songs, song cycle for tenor and piano, Op. 22 (1995); words by John Addington Symonds
   Fortunate Isles
   The Passing Stranger
   Invitation to the Gondola (also for baritone and piano)
   Love's Voice
 At Malvern for voice and piano, Op. 24 (1998); words by John Addington Symonds
 Flying Crooked and At Midnight for voice and piano or string quartet, Op. 28 (1997–1998); words by Robert Graves and Edna St. Vincent Millay
 Acton Burnell for tenor, viola and piano, Op. 30 (1997); words by Rennie Parker
 Invite to Eternity, song cycle for tenor and string quartet, Op. 31 (1997); words by John Clare
   Born upon an Angel's Breast
   An Invite to Eternity
   Evening Bells
   I am
 Six Songs for voice and piano, Op. 33 (1999–2003); words by Jennifer Andrews, Edward Thomas, Ernest Dowson, Charles Bennett, Alfred, Lord Tennyson and Theodore Roethke
   The Way Through
   It Rains
   Vitae summa brevis
   The November Piano
   Break, break, break
   The Hippo (also for voice and string quartet)
 Songs of Eternity and Sorrow, song cycle for tenor, string quartet and piano, Op. 36 (2003); words by
A. E. Housman
   Easter Hymn
   When Green Buds Hang
   Oh, Who is That Young Sinner
   Because I Liked You Better
 Songs of Eternity and Sorrow, song cycle arranged for tenor and piano, Op. 36a (2005)	
 Songs for soprano and piano, Op. 37 (2004, 2008); words by John Clare, Elizabeth Jennings and Robert Nicholls
   Love Lives Beyond
   Friendship
   Aurelia
 On the Wings of Love, six songs for tenor, clarinet and piano, Op. 38 (2006); words by Constantine P. Cavafy,
Federico García Lorca, Jean de Sponde, Emperor Hadrian, Robert Frost and W. B. Yeats
   Ionian Song
   The Moon Sails Out
   Sonnets of Love, No XI
   Animula Vagula, Blandula
   Reluctance
   When You Are Old
 The Pine Boughs Past Music, song cycle for baritone and piano, Op. 39 (2009); words by Ivor Gurney and
Leonard Clark
   The Wind
   Soft Rain
   My Heart Makes Songs on Lonely Roads
   In Memoriam – Ivor Gurney
 Remember This, Cantata for soprano, tenor, string quartet, piano Op. 40 (2008–2011); words by Andrew Motion
 Songs for baritone or mezzo-soprano and piano, Op. 41 (2011–); words by Philip Larkin, Geoffrey Scott, Francis William Bourdillon, Galway Kinnell, Walter de la Mare, James Joyce, John Masefield, W.B.Yeats
   Frutta di mare
   The Night Has a Thousand Eyes
   In a Palor Containing a Table
   Cut Grass
   Little Old Cupid
   Chamber Music III
   On Eastnor Knoll
   What Then?
 The Song of the Severn, song cycle for baritone, string quartet and piano, Op. 43 (2013); words by John Masefield,
A.E. Housman, John Drinkwater and Philip Worner
   On Malvern Hill
   How Clear, How Lovely Bright
   Elgar's Music
   Laugh And Be Merry
   The River In December
 I caught the changes of the year, song for soprano and piano, Op. 45 (2011); words by John Drinkwater
 Through These Pale Cold Days, song cycle for tenor, viola and piano, Op.46 (2016); words by Wilfred Owen, Francis St Vincent Morris, 
Isaac Rosenberg, Siegfried Sassoon and Geoffrey Anketell Studdert Kennedy
   The Send Off
   Procrastination
   Through These Pale Cold Days
   Suicide In The Trenches
   If You Forget
 Ask Nothing More of Me, song for soprano and piano, Op. 47 (2018); words by Algernon Charles Swinburne
 No Doctor Today Thank You, song for tenor and piano, Op. 49 (2019); words by Theodore Roethke
 The Last Invocation, song cycle for tenor and piano, Op. 50 (2019); words by Walt Whitman
  Shine, Shine, Shine!
  Out of May's Shows Selected
  As At Thy Portals Also Death
  The Last Invocation
 Hermes Trismegistus, Dramatic Scena for soprano, viola and piano Op.53 (2022); words by Henry Wadsworth Longfellow

Ivor Gurney
Ian Venables is the Chairman of the Ivor Gurney Society and a trustee of the Ivor Gurney Estate. He is currently working on behalf of the Trust to edit for publication some previously unpublished works by Gurney.

References

External links
Ian Venables's web-site, source for education claims
Ian Venables's publisher
The Songs of Ian Venables, review

British male classical composers
1955 births
Living people
Alumni of Birmingham Conservatoire
British classical composers
Musicians from Liverpool
Alumni of Trinity College of Music
20th-century British composers
20th-century classical composers
21st-century British musicians
21st-century classical composers
20th-century British male musicians
21st-century British male musicians